The Cherry Hill Mall, owned by Pennsylvania Real Estate Investment Trust (PREIT), was originally known as Cherry Hill Shopping Center, commonly reported as the first indoor, climate-controlled shopping center east of the Mississippi River in the United States, and opened on October 11, 1961. Cherry Hill Mall is located in Cherry Hill, New Jersey, within the unincorporated namesake neighborhood and census-designated place (CDP) of Cherry Hill Mall, New Jersey. The mall is bounded by Route 38, Haddonfield Road (County Route 644), Church Road (County Route 616), and Cherry Hill Mall Drive. 

The center was designed by architect Victor Gruen and built and managed by The Rouse Company. Rouse sold its shopping center portfolio to Pennsylvania Real Estate Investment Trust in 2003 as PREIT converted its holdings from residential to retail. The mall is currently anchored by JCPenney, Macy's, and Nordstrom. 

The farm that was near the site of the Cherry Hill Mall is widely held to be the source of the 1962 renaming of what had been called Delaware Township to its current name of Cherry Hill Township. The town was named Cherry Hill in a voter referendum due to the development of a new U.S. Postal Service office for the region, and historical ties to Cherry Hill Farm, which once occupied land opposite the current mall site, and various locations named for the farm, including the Cherry Hill Estates housing development and the Cherry Hill Inn.

History

The Cherry Hill Mall opened on October 11, 1961 on the former site of the  George Jaus farm. It was designed by Victor Gruen and built and managed by The Rouse Company at a cost of $30 million (equivalent to $ million in ). Upon opening, it was the largest mall in the nation and is commonly referred to as the first enclosed and climate-controlled mall in the Eastern United States. The mall featured 90 stores, exotic birds, tropical plants, fountains and a movie theater.

The mall layout was unique for the time. Unlike the dumbbell malls of the time, the mall started from the east anchor, Bamberger's, with a large "Delaware Mall" concourse to the west of it. About halfway along this concourse was an exit way that led back to a twin movie theatre and a children's amusement park with six rides and a mini roller coaster with a giant arcade. The center of the mall featured Cherry Court, a court with high ceilings, more tropical plants, fountains, parrots, plus a staircase leading directly to the second floor into Strawbridge & Clothier. The northern wing featured the "Market Court", Food Fair, and Thrift Drug. There were also a Kresge's, Woolworth's, and two liquor stores.

The mall changed through the years; 1973 brought a detached nine-story office tower. In 1977 a new two-story wing was built in the north part of the mall, following the closure and demolition of Pantry Pride and the Market Court. This wing was anchored by JCPenney. The 1990s brought more change to the mall, with the mall being remodeled once more, featuring a teal/gray color scheme and skylights. The mall received different fountains and the ornate Strawbridge's staircase was replaced with a simple escalator/stairs combination. By 1997, two distinct parts of the mall had formed: an upscale wing near Macy's featuring Banana Republic and Victoria's Secret, while the JCPenney wing featured General Nutrition Centers and several urban shops. In 2003, the mall was sold to Pennsylvania Real Estate Investment Trust (PREIT).

PREIT renovation and expansion

Under PREIT's ownership, Old Navy moved in early on, but the company had bigger plans for the mall. From the period of 2007 to 2009, the mall underwent a massive $220 million renovation that saw  of new retail added. Jim Ryan and his team at JPRA Architects were brought in to create the mall’s new design. Following Strawbridge's closure after the Macy's takeover, the store was razed and backfilled to make way for the new Grand Court featuring  of new retail, along with a new 138,000 sq ft. Nordstrom anchor store which opened on March 27, 2009. 

In December 2022, the Cherry Hill Police Department banned shoppers under the age of eighteen from entering the Cherry Hill Mall unaccompanied between the hours of 4:00 and 7:00 p.m. during the last week of December; this was in response to a series of fights that occurred at the mall five years earlier."Police: Shoppers under 18 banned from Cherry Hill Mall for last week of the year", News 12 New Jersey,December 29, 2022. Accessed January 4, 2023. "Shoppers under 18 are now banned from the Cherry Hill Mall without a parent or adult during the last week of the year.... This came about after an incident at the mall in 2017 that started at JC Penney. Police encountered 700 to 1,000 teens who converged on the mall. Several fights broke out, and five people were arrested."

Anchors
Macy's (opened 1986)
JCPenney (opened 1977)
Nordstrom (opened 2009)
H&M
Forever 21

Former anchors
Strawbridge's (opened 1961) closed and demolished in 2006. Nordstrom was built in its spot.
Bamberger's (now Macy's)

References

External links

Cherry Hill Mall website
Cherry Hill Mall, International Council of Shopping Centers

Cherry Hill, New Jersey
Shopping malls established in 1961
Shopping malls in New Jersey
Buildings and structures in Camden County, New Jersey
Tourist attractions in Camden County, New Jersey
Pennsylvania Real Estate Investment Trust
Victor Gruen buildings